Parkinson's disease (PD) is a degenerative disorder of the central nervous system.  Most people with PD have idiopathic Parkinson's disease (having no specific known cause). A small proportion of cases, however, can be attributed to known genetic factors. Other factors such as environmental toxins, herbicides, pesticides, and fungicides, have been associated with the risk of developing PD, but no causal relationships have been proven.

Genetic factors 

Traditionally, Parkinson's disease has been considered a non-genetic disorder. However, around 15% of individuals with PD have a first-degree relative who has the disease. At least 5% -15%  of cases are known to occur because of a mutation in one of several specific genes, transmitted in either an autosomal-dominant or autosomal-recessive pattern

Mutations in specific genes have been conclusively shown to cause PD. A large number of these genes are linked to translation. Genes which have been implicated in autosomal-dominant PD include PARK1 and PARK4, PARK5, PARK8, PARK11 and GIGYF2 and PARK13 which code for alpha-synuclein (SNCA), UCHL1, leucine-rich repeat kinase 2 (LRRK2 or dardarin) (LRRK2 and Htra2 respectively Genes such as PARK2, PARK6, PARK7 and PARK9 which code for parkin (PRKN), PTEN-induced putative kinase 1 (PINK1), DJ-1 and ATP13A2 respectively have been implicated in the development of autosomal-recessive PD 
Furthermore, mutations in genes including those that code for SNCA, LRRK2 and glucocerebrosidase (GBA) have been found to be risk factors for sporadic PD In most cases, people with these mutations will develop PD. With the exception of LRRK2, however, they account for only a small minority of cases of PD.  The most extensively studied PD-related genes are SNCA and LRRK2.

SNCA gene 

The role of the SNCA gene is significant in PD because the alpha-synuclein protein is the main component of Lewy bodies, which appear as a primary biomarker in the disease. Missense mutations of the gene (in which a single nucleotide is changed), and duplications and triplications of the locus containing it have been found in different groups with familial PD. Level of alpha-synuclein expression correlates with disease onset and progression, with SNCA gene triplication advancing earlier and faster than duplication. Missense mutations in SNCA are rare. On the other hand, multiplications of the SNCA locus account for around 2% of familial cases. Multiplications have been found in asymptomatic carriers, which indicate that penetrance is incomplete or age-dependent.

LRRK2 gene 
The LRRK2 gene (PARK8) encodes for a protein called dardarin. The name dardarin was taken from a Basque word for tremor, because this gene was first identified in families from England and the north of Spain. A significant number of autosomal-dominant Parkinson's disease cases are associated with mutations in the LRRK2 gene Mutations in LRRK2 are the most common known cause of familial and sporadic PD, accounting for approximately 5% of individuals with a family history of the disease and 3% of sporadic cases. There are many different mutations described in LRRK2, however unequivocal proof of causation only exists for a small number. Mutations in PINK1, PRKN, and DJ-1 may cause mitochondrial dysfunction, an element of both idiopathic and genetic PD. Of related interest are mutations in the progranulin gene that have been found to cause corticobasal degeneration seen in dementia. This could be relevant in PD cases associated with dementia.

GBA gene 

Mutations in GBA are known to cause Gaucher's disease. Genome-wide association studies, which search for mutated alleles with low penetrance in sporadic cases, have now yielded many positive results. Mendelian genetics are not strictly observed in GBA mutations found in inherited parkinsonism. Incidentally, both gain-of-function and loss-of-function GBA mutations are proposed to contribute to parkinsonism through effects such as increased alpha-synuclein levels. In patients with Parkinson’s disease, the OR for carrying a GBA mutation was 5·43 (95% CI 3·89–7·57), confirming that mutations in this gene are a common risk factor for Parkinson’s disease.

Genes underlying familial Parkinson's disease

Environmental factors 
Exposure to pesticides, metals, solvents, and other toxicants has been studied as a factor in the development of Parkinson's disease. No definitive causal relationship has yet been established. Recent studies also reveal that individuals that sustain mild head injuries (concussions) also have an increased risk of acquiring the disease. As discussed below, exercise and caffeine consumption are known to help decrease the risks of acquisition.

Pesticides
Evidence from epidemiological, animal, and in vitro studies suggests that exposure to pesticides increases the risk for Parkinson's disease. One meta-analysis found a risk ratio of 1.6 for ever being exposed to a pesticide, with herbicides and insecticides showing the most risk. Rural living, well-drinking, and farming were also associated with Parkinson's, which may be partly explained by pesticide exposure. Organochlorine pesticides (which include DDT) have received the most attention, with several studies reporting that exposure to such pesticides is associated with a doubling of risk for Parkinson's.

Metals
Lead, which was used in gasoline until 1995 and paint until 1978, is known to damage the nervous system in various ways. A few studies have found that people with high levels of lead in their body had twice the risk of Parkinson's disease. Epidemiological studies on lead, however, have found little evidence for a link with Parkinson's. Iron has been implicated in the etiology of Parkinson's disease, but there is no strong evidence that environmental exposure to it is associated with Parkinson's.

Head injuries
A 2012 study suggests that players in the National Football League are three times more likely to die from neurodegenerative diseases, including Alzheimer's and Parkinson's diseases, than the general US population. A 2018 study found 56% increase in risk of Parkinson's disease among US military veterans suffered traumatic brain injury.

Exercise 
While many environmental factors may exacerbate Parkinson's Disease, exercise is considered to be one of the main protective factors for neurodegenerative disorders, including Parkinson's Disease. The types of exercise interventions that have been studied can be categorized as either aerobic or goal-based. Aerobic exercise includes physical activity that increases the heart rate. Aerobic exercise is beneficial to the overall brain through mechanisms that promote neuroplasticity, or the rewiring of the brain circuitry. Goal-based exercises are often developed with the guidance of a physical therapist to use movement to improve motor task performance and enhance motor learning. While exercise has consistently been shown to be beneficial, the optimal interventional benefit is still being researched.

Caffeine consumption 
Smokers and nonsmokers with different rates of caffeine consumption were monitored for their susceptibility to PD. The results indicate that higher coffee/caffeine intake is associated with a significantly lower incidence of PD and that this effect appeared to be independent of smoking.

Environmental-Genetic factors

Polymorphism of CYP2D6 gene and pesticide exposure 
The CYP2D6 gene is primarily expressed in the liver and is responsible for the enzyme cytochrome P450 2D6. A study showed that those who had a mutation of this gene and were exposed to pesticides were twice as likely to develop Parkinson's Disease; those that had the mutation and were not exposed to pesticides were not found to be at an increased risk of developing PD; the pesticides only had a "modest effect" for those without the mutation of the gene.

References 

Parkinson's disease
Parkinson's disease